Henry Fewin (25 January 1896 – 25 August 1980) was an Australian cricketer. He played in one first-class match for Queensland in 1929/30.

See also
 List of Queensland first-class cricketers

References

External links
 

1896 births
1980 deaths
Australian cricketers
Queensland cricketers
Sportspeople from Townsville
Cricketers from Queensland